Sarayevsky (masculine), Sarayevskaya (feminine), or Sarayevskoye (neuter) may refer to:
Sarayevsky District, a district of Ryazan Oblast, Russia
Sarayevskaya, a rural locality (a village) in Arkhangelsk Oblast, Russia